Tearepa Kahi (born 16 March 1994), also known as Te Arepa Kahi, is a New Zealand film director and former actor of Ngāti Paoa and Waikato Tainui descent. Kahi is best known for the 2013 drama Mt. Zion starring Stan Walker, and the Pātea Māori Club documentary Poi E: The Story of a Song (2016).

Biography 

Kahi grew up in Christchurch, and is of Ngāti Paoa and Waikato Tainui descent. Kahi's father was a musician who toured with Billy TK. As a teenager, he spent two years as a part of a theatre troupe run by actor Jim Moriarty. Moving to his grandmother's house in Pukekohe, Kahi studied history and Māori at the University of Auckland. From 1999 to 2002, Kahi acted in minor roles on television shows including Shortland Street, Mataku and Aroha – Irikura, and in the Don Selwyn film The Maori Merchant of Venice (2002). Kahi's co-wrote the short film The Speaker with rapper Savage, which won the award for best short film at the Wairoa Māori Film Festival.

Kahi's debut wide release feature film Mt. Zion was one of the most successful New Zealand films of 2013. Kahi debuted as a television director in 2016, with the release of the Whakaata Māori historical drama series Kairākau (2016).

In 2016, Kahi released his second feature film, Poi E: The Story of a Song, a film documenting the story of the Pātea Māori Club, Dalvanius Prime and the creation of the 1984 hit Māori language single "Poi E". This was followed by a documentary of New Zealand reggae band Herbs in 2019.

In 2022, Kahi will release Muru, a dramatisation of the 2007 New Zealand police raids.

Kahi is a member of the board of the New Zealand International Film Festival.

Personal life 

Kahi acted opposite his wife Reikura Morgan in the film The Maori Merchant of Venice (2002).

Filmography

Films

Television

References

English-language film directors
Living people
New Zealand film directors
New Zealand film producers
New Zealand screenwriters
New Zealand television writers
Ngāti Pāoa people
People educated at Burnside High School
People from Christchurch
University of Auckland alumni
Waikato Tainui people
Māori-language film directors
1994 births